Webster Knob is a prominent rock knob at the head of Strom Glacier in the Queen Maud Mountains. It stands near the extremity of a spur which descends from the northeast shoulder of Mount Fridtjof Nansen. Discovered and visited in November 1929 by the Byrd Antarctic Expedition geological party under Laurence Gould. Named by Byrd for Mrs. Laurence J. Webster, a contributor to the expedition.

Hills of the Ross Dependency
Amundsen Coast